Singerina is a fungal genus in the family Agaricaceae. It is a monotypic genus, containing the single species Singerina indica, found in Maharashtra, southwest India.

The genus name of Singerina is in honour of Rolf Singer (1906–1994), who was a German-born mycologist and one of the most important taxonomists of gilled mushrooms (agarics) in the 20th century.

See also
 List of Agaricaceae genera
 List of Agaricales genera

References

Agaricaceae
Fungi of India
Monotypic Agaricales genera